M115, M1 15 or M-115 may refer to:

 M115 203 mm howitzer, a towed howitzer used by the United States Army
 M115 bomb, a 500-pound anti-crop biological weapon
 M-115 (Michigan highway), a state highway in Michigan
 Mercedes-Benz M115 engine
 M1 15, an electrical tram in Gothenburg, Sweden.